Moghdan (also Romanized as Moghdān; also known as Mofdān, Moqdān, and Mughdun) is a village in Behdasht Rural District, Kushk-e Nar District, Parsian County, Hormozgan Province, Iran. At the 2006 census, its population was 553, in 101 families.

References 

Populated places in Parsian County